Prado Ferreira is a municipality in the state of Paraná in the Southern Region of Brazil.

References

Municipalities in Paraná